Bezdonys Manor is a former residential manor near Bezdonys, Vilnius district in Lithuania.

History
The manor is known from the 15th century, when, according to Jan Długosz, the Grand Duke of Lithuania Jogaila visited the manor in 1415.

References

Manor houses in Lithuania
Neoclassical architecture in Lithuania